Live MCMXCIII ("1993" in Roman numerals) is a live album by the Velvet Underground. It was released simultaneously in single and double CD/cassette formats on October 26, 1993, by Sire Records, then DVD format on January 24, 2006. The single CD is an abridged version of the double CD edition, featuring tracks 2, 13–16, 5, 6, 9, 18, and 20–23 in that order. There are no different takes of songs across the multiple editions although the actual track times differ by a few seconds between releases.

Background
In late 1992, the Velvet Underground 1965–1968 core line-up of Lou Reed, John Cale, Sterling Morrison and Maureen Tucker suddenly decided to reform. The decision was unexpected because the relationship between Reed and Cale had been sour ever since the late 60s, and though it had ameliorated after back catalogue royalty renegotiations in the mid-80s, it had hit another low after their 1990 collaboration Songs for Drella.

Nevertheless, an impromptu one-song reunion in Jouy-en-Josas, France, later that year for an Andy Warhol exhibition set the scene and by 1993, the band had started to rehearse for a world tour. Lou Reed's then-current record company, Sire Records, agreed to release a live album from the European leg, and plans were made for both an MTV Unplugged appearance with accompanying album and a subsequent studio album.

The album was recorded during a three-night residence in the Paris venue L'Olympia. John Cale later said, "During the second night we hit the home run", and it is of this night that most of the Live MCMXCIII tracks were taken. The rest were taken from the third night.

Live MCMXCIII captures the band playing most of their classics from the back catalogue, with emphasis on the more structured songs. The band also performed two new songs: "Velvet Nursery Rhyme", a short tongue-in-cheek reunion theme song where Reed introduces the members of the band, and "Coyote", a Reed/Cale collaboration. Emphasis is on the band's first three records and the "lost fourth album" (see VU and Another View), with only two songs from Loaded.
During the six-week European leg, relationships quickly soured again and by the end of the tour all other plans were off, never to rematerialise. The band's latest breakup proved final when Sterling Morrison died in the summer of 1995.

The Velvet Underground's reunion itself met with critical praise from the mainstream rock press, and generated heavy publicity for the band (resulting in the six-week European leg having many sold out venues or near capacity), but the album received mixed reviews.

After its release, Cale expressed disappointment in the album's mix: "The trouble is that we had an opportunity here with the live album to really show what the band sounded like and it really doesn't give it to you. Some of the bootlegs that came out of the tour are almost a truer vision of what the band sounded like than the well recorded one, because the well recorded one really didn't take advantage of the ambiance of the room in the mix of the music. And that's what we were always pushing at. We wanted to fill the room up with this noise. Unfortunately it wasn't quite as present in the mix as I would have liked it to be or others would have liked it to be either."

Track listing
All tracks written by Lou Reed except as noted.

Double-CD edition

Single-CD edition

Personnel 
The Velvet Underground
John Cale – bass guitar, keyboards, viola, backing vocals, lead vocal on "All Tomorrow's Parties", "The Gift", "Femme Fatale" and "I'm Waiting for the Man"
Sterling Morrison – rhythm and lead guitar, bass guitar, backing vocals
Lou Reed – lead and rhythm guitar, lead vocals
Maureen Tucker – percussion, keyboards on "Black Angel's Death Song", lead vocal on "After Hours" and "I'm Sticking with You"

Technical staff
Mike Rathke – producer

Album Design-Spencer Drate, Judith Salavetz, Sylvia Reed

Photography-Ted Chin

References

External links
The Velvet Underground Web Page

1993 live albums
The Velvet Underground live albums
Sire Records live albums
Films directed by Declan Lowney